Amie Bojang-Sissoho is a Gambian journalist, women's rights activist and politician. She emerged Gambian first woman government's Director of Press and Public Relation following her appointment by president Adama Barrow.

Background and education 
Bojang-Sissoho was born in Gunjur. Her father was Imam Hatab Bojang (1937-1984) and her mother was Ya Khan Jobe. Bojang-Sissoho studied for a bachelor's degree in Media and Cultural Studies at the University of Southampton, United Kingdom.

Career 
She began her professional career with the Gambia Radio & Television Service (GRTS) and worked there for a long time. She was the manager of the presidential campaign of Isatou Touray in the 2016 Gambian presidential election until Touray withdrew his candidacy to support Adama Baroow, who went on to win the election. After taking power, Barrow named her government's Director of Press and Public Relation. Bojang-Sissoho is a Programme Coordinator of the Gambia Committee for Traditional Practices (GAMCOTRAP). she was arrested along with Touray, on October 11, 2010, on charges of embezzlement of 30,000 euros and imprisoned in Mile 2 prison but were cleared of all charges against by the court.

References 

Living people
Year of birth missing (living people) 
Gambian journalists
Gambian women activists
Gambian politicians
21st-century Gambian women politicians
21st-century Gambian politicians